Yinxing de Chibang may refer to:

"Yinxing de Chibang" ("Invisible Wings"), first track from Pandora (Angela Chang album)
Invisible Wings, 2007 Chinese film
Angel Wings (TV series), 2016 Chinese TV series